Wojciech Natusiewicz (born 7 July 1975) is a Polish weightlifter. He competed in the men's featherweight event at the 1996 Summer Olympics.

References

1975 births
Living people
Polish male weightlifters
Olympic weightlifters of Poland
Weightlifters at the 1996 Summer Olympics
People from Koszalin